Scream Queen Hot Tub Party is a 1991 American black comedy horror film directed by Fred Olen Ray. The film stars scream queens Linnea Quigley, Brinke Stevens and Michelle Bauer.

Cast
Linnea Quigley as Herself
Brinke Stevens as Herself
Monique Gabrielle as Herself
Kelli Maroney as Herself
Michelle Bauer as Herself
Roxanne Kernohan as Herself

Production
Ray says the film was shot in one day:
Back in the day, sometimes you wanted to own something. All you did was work for other people, then you'd sit back and watch thousands of units move out and you never got a piece of it. You kept thinking the only difference between you and these guys was you couldn't afford to make a production. At that time, we were dating some of these girls. That's how they became partners in the show. I shot it in my house and we did it very cheaply, but it turned out to be quite successful.  We never licensed it. We ran into somebody who had some kind of a connection at a magazine, and they were buying the VHSes and selling them through some ad in a magazine. It came to thousands and thousands of units. We never ever had to license that thing out to anybody. We did a license in the UK but in the United States, we shipped the VHSes ourselves and we never went through another company and it did very well. It was just a little nothing ... Roger Corman and everybody gave us permission to use a certain amount of minutes from films we had made for them, so we were able to pad it all out.

References

External links

1991 films
Films directed by Fred Olen Ray
Films directed by Jim Wynorski
American comedy horror films
1990s comedy horror films
1991 comedy films
1990s English-language films
1990s American films